Monika Satya Kalra Varma is the Director of Robert F. Kennedy Center for Justice and Human Rights (RFK Center).  Varma is on the Editorial Board of the François-Xavier Bagnoud Health and Human Rights at Harvard University She serves on the Advisory Board for the Global India Fund.  Previously, Varma worked for the International Criminal Tribunal for the former Yugoslavia in Hague, Netherlands. She received her Juris Doctor degree from the University of California, Davis School of Law, and published "Forced Marriage: Rwanda's Secret Revealed," 11 U.C. Davis Journal of Law & Policy 197-221 (2001).

References

Living people
UC Davis School of Law alumni
American lawyers
Harvard University people
American women lawyers
American politicians of Indian descent
Year of birth missing (living people)
21st-century American women